Uladzimir Mikalayevich Karvat (November 28, 1959, Brest, Belarus – May 23, 1996) was a pilot for the Belarusian Air Force and was the first recipient of the title Hero of Belarus.

Early life and career

Karvat  was born in the city of Brest, on May 28, 1959, in the Byelorussian Soviet Socialist Republic. He joined the Soviet Air Force in 1981 and completed courses at the higher piloting school in Armavir. Afterwards, he was deployed to the Far East of the Russian SFSR. There, Karvat advanced from being a normal pilot, to the commander of a flight training squadron.

He had been awarded the Order for Service to the Homeland in the Armed Forces of the USSR 3rd class and the Jubilee Medal "70 Years of the Armed Forces of the USSR".

In August 1994, three years after the Soviet Union collapsed, he decided to serve in the newly created Armed Forces of Belarus. On September 11, 1994, Karvat took an oath of loyalty to the people of Belarus. He was given the command of a tactical training unit of the 61st airbase in Baranovichi.

Accident

Karvat was honored posthumously for his heroic actions, which took place on November 21, 1996, when his training aircraft (a Sukhoi Su-27p) caught fire. Though he was given the order to eject, the plane was heading directly for a populated area. Keeping that in mind, Karvat steered the plane until it crashed 1 km away from the area of Hacišča, killing him. President Alexander Lukashenko issued Decree Number 484 that day, awarding Karvat with the title Hero of Belarus. The decree stated: "For heroism while in the performance of military duty, we award Lieutenant Colonel Karvat, Uładzimir Mikałajevič the title "Hero of Belarus" (posthumous).

References

External links
Karvat's plane and memorial in Hacišča
Obituary by the Belarusian Army

1958 births
1996 deaths
People from Brest, Belarus
Belarusian aviators
Belarusian military personnel
Aviators killed in aviation accidents or incidents
National Heroes of Belarus
Victims of aviation accidents or incidents in Belarus
Victims of aviation accidents or incidents in 1996